Roman Sergeyevich Denisov (born 14 April 1999) is a Russian football player who plays for FC Neftekhimik Nizhnekamsk.

Club career
He made his debut in the Russian Football National League for FC Neftekhimik Nizhnekamsk on 27 February 2021 in a game against FC Irtysh Omsk.

References

External links
 
 Profile by Russian Football National League

1999 births
People from Krasnogorsk, Moscow Oblast
Sportspeople from Moscow Oblast
Living people
Russian footballers
Russia youth international footballers
Association football midfielders
FC Dynamo Moscow reserves players
FC Neftekhimik Nizhnekamsk players
Russian First League players
Russian Second League players